Ruth Hellberg (2 November 1906 – 26 April 2001) was a German actress. She appeared in more than 25 films between 1933 and 1991.

Selected filmography
 What Men Know (1933)
 Yvette (1938)
 Heimat (1938)
 Drei Unteroffiziere (1939)
 Bismarck (1940)
 Twilight (1940)
 Heimkehr (1941)
 The Terrible Threesome (1991)

References

External links

1906 births
2001 deaths
German film actresses
20th-century German actresses
Actresses from Berlin